David A. Cardwell, FREng, is a British superconducting engineer. He is a professor of superconducting engineering, Pro-Vice-Chancellor for Strategy and Planning at the University of Cambridge, former head of the University of Cambridge Department of Engineering, former co-director of the KACST-Cambridge Research Centre and a fellow of Fitzwilliam College.  In 2012, Cardwell was elected as a fellow of the Royal Academy of Engineering.

Education

Cardwell studied at the University of Warwick (BSc 1983, PhD 1987).  He is a fellow of the Institute of Physics and the Institution of Engineering and Technology.

Degrees
DSc, Warwick University, 2015
ScD, University of Cambridge, 2014 
MA, University of Cambridge, 1995 
PhD, Warwick University, 1987 
BSc, Warwick University, 1983

Research interests
Professor Cardwell's research interests include the processing, modelling and characterisation of bulk superconductors for high-field engineering applications. Materials of particular interest include high-temperature superconductors within the (RE)BCO family and MgB2. He has authored or co-authored more than 370 published papers.

Current positions

Pro-Vice-Chancellor (Strategy & Planning)
Co-director of the KACST-Cambridge Research Centre
Treasurer of the European Society for Applied Superconductivity
Member of the Advisory Board of Superconductor Science and Technology

Distinctions

Fellow of the Royal Academy of Engineering
Fellow of the Institute of Physics
Fellow of the IET

Prizes

The Society of Automotive Engineering (SAE) Arch T. Colwell Merit Award, 2008
PASREG prize for excellence in the processing of bulk superconductors, 2001

See also 
 University of Cambridge
 High-temperature superconductivity

References

External links

University of Cambridge
University of Cambridge Department of Engineering

Superconductivity scientists and engineers
English electrical engineers
Fellows of the Royal Academy of Engineering
Members of the University of Cambridge Department of Engineering
Alumni of Fitzwilliam College, Cambridge
Fellows of Fitzwilliam College, Cambridge
Alumni of the University of Warwick
Living people
Year of birth missing (living people)
Place of birth missing (living people)
Engineering professors at the University of Cambridge